Epinotia monticola is a species of moth of the family Tortricidae. It is found in Taiwan.

References

Moths described in 1993
Eucosmini